The phrase Seven Kingdoms can refer to:

History 
Seven Kingdoms of Kongo dia Nlaza, the precursors to the Kingdom of Kongo in Central Africa
Seven Warring States, the combatants from a turbulent period of Chinese history
Heptarchy, the precursors to the Kingdom of England in English history

Other  
Seven Kingdoms (A Song of Ice and Fire), in the A Song of Ice and Fire fantasy novel series 
Seven Kingdoms (band), an American power metal band
Seven Kingdoms (video game)
 Seven kingdoms (biology)